Ray Zone (1947–2012) was an American film historian, author, artist, and pioneer in methods of converting flat images (in particular, comic books) into stereoscopic images.

Starlog called him the "King of 3-D Comics", and Artsy Planet called him the "3D King of Hollywood".

Biography
Zone attributed his interest in 3D to having read Mighty Mouse comic books in 3D at the age of 6, in 1953. He moved to Los Angeles in the early 1980s and began converting flat art to 3D images. He began working in comic books in 1983, and his early collaborations with Jack C. Harris and Steve Ditko drew the attention of Archie Goodwin, who recruited him to work with John Byrne on the 1990 Batman 3-D, a full-length 3D graphic novella. Zone produced 3D adaptations of art for over 150 comic books, for clients such as Disney, Warner Bros and the Simpsons, and including stories by Alan Moore and Grant Morrison which were specifically written to accommodate stereoscopy.

An internationally recognized expert in all things 3-D, Zone had a special interest in stereoscopic cinema and Large Format 3-D (15/70) filmmaking. He created stereo conversions and stereoscopic images for a wide variety of clients in publishing, education, advertising, television and motion pictures. In 2006 Zone was the 3D Artist on the Tool album 10,000 Days, which won that year's Grammy Award for Best Recording Package. He received numerous awards for his 3-D work, among them a 1987 Inkpot Award from the San Diego Comic-Con for "Outstanding Achievement in Comic Arts", and

He was the author of "3D Filmmakers, Conversations with Creators of Stereoscopic Motion Pictures" (Scarecrow Press: 2005), "Stereoscopic Cinema and the Origins of 3-D Film, 1838 - 1952" (University Press of Kentucky: 2007), "3-DIY: Stereoscopic Moviemaking on an Indie Budget" (Focal Press: 2012), and "3-D Revolution: The History of Modern Stereoscopic Cinema" (University Press of Kentucky: 2012).

In 2008 Zone worked as 3D Supervisor on Dark Country  with director/star Thomas Jane, and in 2010 as 3D Producer on "Guardians of the Lost Code", the first animated 3D feature film made in Mexico.

Bibliography
Work includes:
Batman 3D (with John Byrne, Arthur Adams, 80 pages, Titan Books)
3D Filmmakers, Conversations with Creators of Stereoscopic Motion Pictures, Scarecrow Press
Stereoscopic Cinema and the Origins of 3-D Film, 1838 - 1952, University Press of Kentucky
3-DIY: Stereoscopic Moviemaking on an Indie Budget, Focal Press 
3-D Revolution: The History of Modern Stereoscopic Cinema, University Press of Kentucky

References

External links
Official site (via archive.is)

Checklist of comic books featuring Ray Zone work
 CES: Ray Zone 'King of 3D art' bullish on 3D TV (podcast), Cnet, January 9, 2010
The History of 3D Comics Exhibition & Opening Reception, Comixlist, July 19, 2007

1947 births
2012 deaths
American film historians
American male non-fiction writers
Inkpot Award winners
Stereoscopy